John Owen Isaacs (1920–2001) was an English aeronautical engineer, aircraft designer and builder.

Isaacs was born in Southampton, Hampshire on 10 May 1920. In August 1937 he became an apprentice aircraft engineer at the Supermarine Aviation Works, Woolston, Southampton. He left Supermarine in 1958 and became a further education lecturer at the Southampton Technical College until 1978.

He obtained a pilot's licence in 1946 and then used his engineering experience to build a Currie Wot biplane for the Hampshire Aero Club. In the early 1960s Isaacs went on to design a scaled down aircraft based on the Hawker Fury, this was followed by a scaled down design based on the Supermarine Spitfire. He made plans available for the two designs to enable them to be built at home by amateurs. He inspired and helped many amateur builders.

In 1988 he wrote his autobiography An Aeroplane Affair and he died in 2001.

Aircraft designs
Isaacs Fury
Isaacs Spitfire

References

1920 births
2001 deaths
English aviators
English aerospace engineers
Defunct aircraft manufacturers of England
Homebuilt aircraft
Engineers from Southampton